Cueva de la Momia is an archaeological site located in the region of Ciudad Madera, in the Sirupa Canyon region, in the northwest of the Mexican state of Chihuahua. It is located at the foot of a very high cliff on the ravine of the Arroyo del Venado, shortly before it joins the Rio Chico; in the vicinity of the Huápoca Canyon, is a series of caves where a number of mummies were found.

The site, on the Huápoca ravines in the Sierra Tarahumara, home of the Tarahumara or Rarámuri, not far from Ciudad Madera in the beautiful mountains of the Sierra Madre of Chihuahua State, the entrance of the cave was discovered in situ, the mummified body of an adult person, possibly female, in perfect state of conservation with surprising details such as skin, hair, nails, and even some teeth.

The site received its name because it was said to contain several mummies. Which was entirely true, though there was vandals destruction, one could be saved in perfect conservation state. The cave has two levels; some archaeological remains can be seen. The top level was a housing complex.

The mummy rests in a special Museum next to the "Real del Bosque" motel on the outskirts of Ciudad Madera, which was purpose-built by Captain Leal, owner of the motel.

First Investigations 
In 1898, Norwegian Explorer Darl Lumbholtz, provided first notices about caves in the Madera region, in the north of Sierra Tarahumara. Discovered several sites, among them Cueva del Garabato (scribble), now known as Cuarenta Casas.

Subsequently, several anthropologists and archaeologists briefly explored the region, focusing especially on the outskirts of Cuarenta Casas. Almost all of them published the results of their studies;

H.A. Carey in 1931.
E.B. Sayles in 1936
A.V. Kidder in 1939,
R.H. Lister in 1946 & 1958
Eduardo Contreras in 1959
Arturo Guevara in 1986,
David Pearson, Fernando Sánchez M. and D, Phillips in 1990.

However, very little is known about the caves,  exploration and systematic study is just starting up.

The Madera Zone
Madera was a sawmill that worked lumber extracted in the forests nearby; its greatest attractions are the ancient caves around the region, which served as room and shelter for inhabitants of the Paquimé culture, who built their homes within them.

There are several Paquimé culture archaeological zones in the area of Madera municipality. The most important caves are:

Huápoca
Located 36 miles west of Madera, on a dirt road.

The Huápoca caves consist of the "Serpiente" and the Nido de Aguila caves. These are considered the most impressive on a cliff. It has complete structures.

It has magnificent views of the Huápoca Canyon.

Cueva de la Serpiente
It has 14 adobe houses, over 1,000 years old.

Nido del águila
It only has one house, built on the edge of a sheer cliff under a rocky overhang, provides a meaning to its name.

Cueva Grande
Located 66 kilometers west of Madera, on a dirt road. Cueva Grande hides within convoluted land and behind branches of trees. The mouth of the cave is obscured by a waterfall from the top of the cave to a stream.
There are two, double-story houses (800 years old) that are good examples of the native construction techniques. There is also a round grain storage area behind the structure.

La Ranchería 
Cave complex, 50 kilometers south of Madera. Has an extended archaeological remain area at the base of the Sirupa canyon.

Cueva del Puente
45 kilómeters north of Madera

Cuarenta Casas 
Cuevas El Garabato or Cueva de Las Ventanas, known as Cuarenta Casas was built between 1060 and 1205 CE, residential complex of the Paquimé culture inhabitants.

This complex (located in the Garabato Creek) has an interesting number of constructions and the great cave, guarded by a small waterfall.

New Discoveries 
In one of the Rio Papigochi side canyons, southwest of Madera, is a complex that was inhabited by ancient communities that built homes in the caves and rock shelters. These sites are so safe that todate are virtually intact.

None of these caves can be easily seen, the only way to know they are there, is when you are inside.

Cueva de los Fierros 
Located in the middle of the Canyon slope in an almost vertical wall. Its size is about 30 m and has a complex of at least 10 adobe rooms, some of them in two floors. The whole has a foundation base, as a terrace, on which the rooms were built, the windows are "T" shape, typical paquimé culture.

Almost all rooms are partially destroyed; ceilings still preserved the original wooden structure, inside were found some stone tools such as scrapers, knives, grindstones, fragments of pottery and other objects which could not be identified. There were many olotes found, evidence of corn consumptions and storage.

Cueva de la Puerta
Located a few hundred meters from the first cave, also found in the middle of the canyon wall. It measures around 25 m and presents vestiges of approximately 12 rooms or enclosures, vandals or treasure hunters partially destroyed floors and walls.

It can be appreciated how ancient houses were built. For construction they used a kind of braided rods and branches of local trees, mainly tascar (local species of Juniper) and Fraxinus, over the braids they shaped the adobe walls. The braid is well preserved, still has the fiber used to fasten them. There are two types of fastening; one made with "palmilla" fiber (a species of Century Plant or agave and the other with a tree branch called "sawarique". In one of the rooms, the original floor can be seen, made from adobe so well and smooth finished that it looks like cement. Roof and walls of rooms are black, probably by the accumulation of soot and smoke from fires that through hundreds of years were lit there.  There is another cave in the opposite side of the canyon, is smaller with only three rooms, but very well preserved.

Half a kilometer above is a small cave with a lonely and small house in very good condition. With an excellent view of the Canyon, probably this place was an observation or surveillance point.

The Cultures

Human groups of hunter-gatherers arrive in the region from the north, probably Mogollon, Anasazi or Hohokam, following the Sierra Madre Occidental; used plants, took advantage of smaller animal species, as turkeys; occupied the mountains and gradually dispersed in rivers, developing the Paquimé  culture or "Casas Grandes", whose first settlers were collectors in the process of learning sedentary traits. An important fact to know is that all of these major centers are aligned on the 108 degree Longitudinal axis.

Mogollon culture ( or ) evidences have been found, simple ceramic fragments and other more scarce luxury type materials, characteristic of the Paquime culture. The Site constructors probably were villagers who in addition to intensively exploit the environment, as can be seen in the premises vestiges, cultivated corn, squash, and beans, therefore they established a community use system.

Important evidence exists of northern Mexico settlers, of the Casas Grandes culture, sub-region of the Mogollon culture, that along with the Anasazi and the Hohokam comprise the Oasisamerica area. The northern cultural region is known in Mexico as "Gran Chichimeca" and in United States is called American Southwest.

Sites of culture are located in the State of Chihuahua; Paquimé was the head and commercial center of the region. The first settlements in this culture are dated 1000 BCE, since the late archaic); its apogee occurred between 1261 and 1300 CE, and disappeared in 1450 CE.

The difficult nature of this area shaped the distinctive traits of its inhabitants; who developed from nomadic hunter-gatherers to sedentary, farmed the land and animals.

Sites of the culture are found from the Pacific Ocean coast to the Sierra Madre Occidental, passing through all kinds of ecological and climate environment.

El Sitio
The cave lies at the foot of a vertical cliff and from the entrance has an excellent view. The cave has two levels, in both are numerous archaeological remains. On the upper level there are more than 10 very well preserved adobe rooms. The first level is only a rocky shelter; to reach the second level, a makeshift ladder is used, then follow up a ramp between stones to the second level. This room has a wide window from which a beautiful view of the Canyon is seen. The cave is not very wide, but it is an excellent shelter. At the precipice edge, next to the window, are the remains of an old adobe room. On the floor of this room was the partly buried mummy was found.

At the entrance of another adobe house, are remains of another mummy, badly damaged by vandals. It contained much of the remains and tissue and the Petate bedroll used to wrap the burial. For a couple of years Ciudad Juárez Autonomous University scholars denounced to INAH their finding, but to date there has been no response.

Rooms
In both levels are archeological remains on both sides.

At the top level, is a complex of small houses made of mud and grass that had been built in the shelter of the cave.

These valuable remains of the Paquimé culture, part of the so-called Oasisamerica region, are at serious risk, given that antiques buyers are eager to get these pieces, especially in the United States; and must sadly note, the Government abandonment, also responsible for the situation.

The mummy 
The mummified body of an adult individual was found, surrounded by offerings such as ceramics, stone utensils, stems and corn cobs.

This Mummy, was found some time ago by vandal treasure hunters, and fortunately abandoned on the floor of the room at one end, while greedily digging at the opposite end.

They destroyed everything they encountered, including some other mummies found in place, leaving scattered useless fragments. Beautifully Paquime style vases decorated with geometric motifs were torn in their search process. Destroyed vestiges of bonfires and food remains, that would be faithful witnesses of the native way of life.

See also 
 Ciudad Madera, Chihuahua
 Mogollon culture
 Oasisamerica
 Cuarenta Casas
 Cueva de la Olla (archaeological site)
 Cueva de la Ranchería

References

External links 
 The Mogollon: Prehistoric Desert Peoples
 People of the Colorado Plateau
 National Park Service official site
 Firecracker Pueblo 
 The Paquime region 

Archaeological sites in Chihuahua (state)
Mogollon culture
Landmarks in Chihuahua (state)